
Sieradz County is a unit of territorial administration and local government (powiat) in Łódź Voivodeship, central Poland. It came into being on January 1, 1999, as a result of the Polish local government reforms passed in 1998.

As of 2006 its total population is 121,013, out of which the population of Sieradz is 44,045, that of Złoczew is 3,403, that of Warta is 3,388, that of Błaszki is 2,179, and the rural population is 67,998.

Neighbouring counties
Sieradz County is bordered by Turek County and Poddębice County to the north, Zduńska Wola County and Łask County to the east, Wieluń County to the south, Wieruszów County to the south-west, and Ostrzeszów County and Kalisz County to the west.

Administrative division
The county is subdivided into 11 gminas (one urban, three urban-rural and seven rural). These are listed in the following table, in descending order of population.

References
Polish official population figures 2006

 
Sieradz